Androstephium breviflorum is a species of flowering plant  known by the common names pink funnel lily and small flowered androstephium.

Distribution
This monocot plant is native to the deserts of the Western United States from Wyoming and New Mexico west through the Great Basin and Sonoran Desert, to creosote bush scrub in the Mojave Desert of eastern California.

Description
Androstephium breviflorum is a perennial herb growing from a spherical corm.

Its inflorescence is a peduncle up to 30 centimeters tall containing up to 12 white to light lavender funnel-shaped flowers each one or two centimeters long. The bloom period is March to June.

The fruit is a 3-lobed capsule just over a centimeter long.

History
Androstephium breviflorum was published as a new species by Sereno Watson in 1873, based on material collected by Ellen Powell Thompson in 1872 in the vicinity of Kanab, Utah, during the US Topographical and Geological Survey of the Colorado River (led by John Wesley Powell). Her specimen, the holotype, resides in the United States National Herbarium (US).

References

External links
Calflora Database: Androstephium breviflorum (Pink funnel lily,  Small flowered androstephium)
Jepson Manual eFlora (TJM2) treatment of Androstephium breviflorum
USDA Plants Profile for Androstephium breviflorum (pink funnel lily)
Flora of North America
UC CalPhotos gallery

Brodiaeoideae
Flora of the Southwestern United States
Flora of the California desert regions
Flora of Colorado
Flora of New Mexico
Flora of Wyoming
Flora of the Great Basin
Flora of the Sonoran Deserts
Endemic flora of the United States
Natural history of the Mojave Desert
Plants described in 1873
Taxa named by Sereno Watson
Flora without expected TNC conservation status